Jean Fay Field (born 10 April 1936) is a South African former cricketer who played as a right-arm medium-fast bowler. She appeared in three Test matches for South Africa in 1960 and 1961, all against England. She was the first South African woman to take a five-wicket haul in a Test match. She played domestic cricket for Southern Transvaal.

Career
Part of the Southern Transvaal women's cricket team, McNaughton made her first appearance of the English tour in 1960–61 for her club side.  Batting at number five, she scored 15 runs in 22 minutes.  In the English innings, she only bowled four overs, taking no wickets and conceding 22 runs.

Playing in South Africa's first Test match she made a pair, becoming only the second woman, after England's player/manager Netta Rheinberg in 1949, to do so on debut.  She also remained wicket-less in the match, bowling a total of nine overs.  She did not play in the second Test, and scored one run in each of her two innings for South African XI women against England during a tour match.

Back in the team for the third Test at Sahara Stadium Kingsmead, Durban, McNaughton claimed six of the eight English wickets to fall in their first-innings, making her the first South African woman to take a five-wicket haul in Test cricket.  In spite of her achievement, England won the match by eight wickets.  In the final Test of the series, she scored her highest total in Test cricket, hitting 28 runs to help give her team a first-innings lead, and support Yvonne van Mentz as she closed in on her century.

References

External links
 
 

Living people
1936 births
Cricketers from Johannesburg
South African women cricketers
South Africa women Test cricketers
Central Gauteng women cricketers